Disney's Blizzard Beach is a water theme park located at the Walt Disney World Resort in Bay Lake, Florida near Orlando. All water areas are heated (at approximately ), with the exception of the melting snow in the ice cave of Cross Country Creek.

The park opened on April 1, 1995 and was the third Walt Disney World water park. In 2016, the park hosted approximately 2,091,000  guests, ranking it the third-most visited water park in the world, behind its sister park, Typhoon Lagoon. Blizzard Beach is open year-round with an annual maintenance closure in the winter. During the closure, its sister park, Typhoon Lagoon, will remain open.

Mount Gushmore is split into three colored slopes to aid guests navigating around the park: Green, Red, and Purple.

The park's whimsical and imaginative concept was conceived by designer-Imagineer Marshall Monroe, who, at the time, was a Creative Executive and Principle Technical Staff at the Walt Disney Company.  Innovative elements of the park include a beach chair-themed chair lift, complete with beach umbrellas, and pretend snow skis.  The setting and atmosphere of the park are marked by a unique blending of tropical landscaping with simulated melting snow throughout.  The mountain is a unique engineering structure constructed in a challenging setting - a high water table Florida woodland.  And the architecture is a playful intersection of alpine lodges with Caribbean colors and accents.

The water park, along with all the other Walt Disney World parks, closed in March 2020 due to the ongoing COVID-19 pandemic. Blizzard Beach, along with Typhoon Lagoon, remained closed whilst the four theme parks reopened July 11–15, 2020. Disney's Blizzard Beach reopened at Walt Disney World Resort on March 7, 2021, after being closed nearly a year due to the COVID-19 pandemic.

Park story

According to Disney "legend," a freak snowstorm on January 11, 1977, in the area led to the development of Florida's first ski resort. Ski lifts were put up, toboggan runs were laid down and an entire resort area blossomed around the mountain of snow. Naturally, because of the normal temperatures in Florida, the snow dissipated very quickly, and the snow rapidly turned into slush. This left behind a collection of waterlogged yet snowless ski jumps and chair lifts. The operators were preparing to cut their losses and walk away. However, they were interrupted by a loud yell coming from the summit of the mountain of melting snow and looked up to see a blue alligator sliding down the mountain at top speed. Ice Gator, the mascot, then landed in a pool of melted snow at the base of the mountain with a thunderous splash. The ski resort operators suddenly saw the park's potential, and the mountain of snow became Disney's Blizzard Beach, "the most slushy, slippery, exhilarating water park anywhere!"

Slalom courses, bobsled, and toboggan runs became downhill water slides. The creek of melted snow that formed at the base of the mountain became a relaxing tube ride. The chairlift carried swimmers instead of skiers. The ski jump became the tallest and fastest water slide in the world.

Park layout

Green Slope
The Green Slope attractions (all are single-track water slides, and as such are not meant for racing), are found at the uppermost point of Mount Gushmore. They can be accessed by foot, or by chairlift. The chairlift is a one-way ride, except for guests with disabilities.

It's the third-tallest and fastest free-fall slide in the world. There is a minimum height requirement of .Summit Plummet is one of the highest and fastest water slides on Earth. Barely behind "Insano" in Beach Park in Brazil which, when opened in 1989, was credited by Guinness World Records as the tallest and fastest water slide on Earth.

This attraction sends guests down a twisting series of rushing waterfalls. Water park guests sit in large blue rubber rafts, which can hold a minimum of four and a maximum of six people, equipped with handles to hold on while the gushing water takes riders down the slide. No infants are allowed and other health restrictions are advised.
It has two places where it almost levels off, only to drop back down again. As such, it is one of only a few water slides where "air time" is achieved.

Purple Slope
Access to the Purple Slope attractions (all of which have at least two nearly identical tracks, and as such are designed for racing), is from a pathway next to the catch pool of Downhill Double Dipper.

 is one of the world's only side-by-side racing tube slides. It is located next to Snow Stormers on Mount Gushmore. Time clocks count off each downhill heat and the runs are outfitted with automated audio equipment that signals the start of each race. Also, it is one of the few racing slides where push-off speed is not a factor, as gates hold back riders until it is time for the race to begin.
This attraction sits between Downhill Double Dipper and Toboggan Racers on Mount Gushmore. The attraction descends from the top of the mountain and follows a switchback course through ski-type slalom gates. Guests lie on their stomach on the toboggan-style mat as they ride down the flumes. Mat pickup at the top of attraction (shares mat conveyor with Toboggan Racers).
 is an 8-lane,  water slide next to Snow Stormers on Mount Gushmore. The attraction sends guests racing over dips as they descend the "snow" slope along the side of Mount Gushmore. Similar to Snow Stormers, guests lie on their stomach on the toboggan-style mat as they race to the finish line. Mat pickup at the top of attraction (shares mat conveyor with Snow Stormers).

Red Slope
The Red Slope is found at the very rear of the park, containing only one attraction (a multi-slide attraction, but not designed for racing, due to the slides being different).

 is a  inner tube run featuring two open and one enclosed tube slides. This attraction careens guests down twisting, turning flumes, passing through corrugated steel pipes. Tubes available at the bottom of the attraction. Guests have to be ambulatory in order to ride as stairs are the only way to access this attraction. After reopening in 2018, after a year-long refurbishment, one of the open tube slides was closed. This attraction now only operates with one open and one enclosed tube slide. In 2019, the third tube slide re-opened to lower lines.

Ground level
 is a  wave pool nestled against the base of Mount Gushmore. This attraction is constantly fed by "melting snow" waterfalls creating "bobbing" (short) waves.
 is a  slow-moving water attraction commonly known as a "lazy river," that travels around the perimeter of the water park. The attraction carries floating guests (in inner tubes) through a supposed ice cave. Once inside the mysterious cave, guests will be splashed with the "melting" ice from overhead. There are 7 entrances and exits located throughout the park for this attraction, and at any of these locations, guests may pick up tubes and leave them as they exit the creek. The journey takes between twenty and thirty minutes to complete depending on crowd levels.

 Training Camp is an area for pre-teenage children.
 Leisure Pool - The pool contains "icebergs" on which guests under 12 can walk across.
 Freezin' Pipe Springs - This attraction is a short body slide. It deposits guests in the same water area as Fahrenheit Drops, but has no height restriction.
 Cool Runners - a wide-open slide (inner tube) area created by rapidly melting snow mounds (moguls).
 features gentle slides designed to resemble scaled-down versions of attractions at Blizzard Beach and characters from Frozen. Also included is a snow-castle fountain play area with pop (water) jets. Picnic benches also provided. Footwear is suggested due to hot pavement. The attraction is limited to children under .
The Chairlift is a "one-way" ride that carries up to 3 guests over the craggy face of Mount Gushmore, from its base at the beach to its summit. The chairs carrying guests feature wooden bench seats, colorful overhead umbrellas, and snow skis on their underside. This is the most recognized means of transport to the summit, where many of the rides are located (Guests can also climb a staircase to the top). A Gondola is also provided for disabled guests to access the top of Mount Gushmore.

Food and beverage
Avalunch: Offers light snacks and refreshments. Located next to the entrance of the Chairlift.
Frostbite Freddie's: Bar located adjacent to Snowless Joe's in the Village.
Lottawatta Lodge: Ski lodge providing outdoor covered seating and is the main counter service area.
Polar Pub: Bar located on the beach by the wave pool.
I. C. Expeditions: Offers ice cream, desserts, and refreshments. Located near the Chairlift.
The Cooling Hut: Offers light snacks and refreshments. Located in the Village.
The Warming Hut: Offers hot food and refreshments.

Coolers are allowed in the water parks. The only restricted items are glass and alcohol.

Merchandise
Shade Shack: Jewelry store featuring pearls. Located in the Village across from the changing rooms.
Snowless Joe's: Rental location offering locker and towel rentals and complimentary lifejackets. Located in the Village next to the changing rooms.
The Beach Haus: Main merchandise store and rental location (lockers, towels, and lifejackets) offering souvenirs, swimwear, footwear, etc. Located in the Village in-between the Main Entrance and Lottawatta Lodge.

References

External links 

1995 establishments in Florida
Blizzard Beach
Water parks in Florida
Blizzard Beach
Amusement parks opened in 1995